Orange County Choppers (OCC) is an American motorcycle manufacturer and lifestyle brand company based in the town of Newburgh, located in Orange County, New York, that was founded in 1999 by Paul Teutul Sr. The company was featured on American Chopper, a reality TV show that debuted in September 2002 on the Discovery Channel. The series moved to Discovery Channel's sister channel TLC in 2007. Following cancellation of the Discovery series, the company was also featured on Orange County Choppers on the CMT network in 2013. Orange County Choppers returned to Discovery Channel in March 2018.

History 

In the late 1990s, Paul Teutul Sr. began manufacturing custom motorcycles as an extension of his steel business (OC Iron Works), and in 1999 he founded Orange County Choppers. The company's first bike, "True Blue", was debuted at the 1999 Daytona Biketoberfest.

In late 2020, the decision was made to close the Newburgh location and build a new facility in Pinellas Park, Florida, adjoining Bert's Barracuda Harley-Davidson. The new location, named OCC Road House & Museum, will include a bike-building shop and retail section, museum, restaurant, billiard hall, and concert pavilion. The building opened in late June, 2021.

Key on-air personnel 
 Josh McMann – CEO
 Paul Teutul Sr. – former owner/CEO
 Jason Pohl – senior designer

Former on-air personnel 
 Paul Teutul Jr. – former minority owner/chief designer and fabricator
 Vincent DiMartino – mechanic/assembler (resigned in 2007)
 Cody Connelly – mechanic/assembler (resigned in 2007)
 Michael Teutul – assistant general manager
 Jim "JQ" Quinn – engineer/machinist
 Rick Petko – designer/senior fabricator

Bikes 

OCC is known for building custom theme bikes featured on American Chopper. Additionally, OCC launched a limited edition production line of motorcycles in July 2007, priced beginning at $31,000.

One of OCC's most popular bikes is The Fire Bike, to commemorate the New York firefighters who lost their lives on 9/11. The bike itself has been modeled after a fire truck, and a steel rivet that came from the collapsed World Trade Center is mounted atop the bike's gas tank. Paul Jr. stated that the bike was named "343", the number of New York firefighters who died on 9/11.

The popularity of American Chopper led the United States Air Force to commission a $150,000 "Air Force Bike", first put on public display in March 2005. The motorcycle is ten feet long and is modeled after the F-22 Raptor, complete with Air Force symbol rims, riveted gas tank, Raptor exhausts and rear view mirrors in the shape of jets.

Music 
Orange County Choppers held a series of free music performances within the retail store. P.O.D., Candlebox, Saliva, Red, 10 Years, Fair to Midland, and Framing Hanley have performed. On April 25, 2009, Smile Empty Soul and Earshot performed to celebrate the decade of the company's work. Additionally, OCC in October in conjunction with RED/Sony released a classic rock compilation CD featuring some of Paul Sr.'s favorite songs titled OCC Rocks. The CD also includes original music from The OCC Band, which features four of the shop's employees. Black Label Society performed a concert in the retail store to promote their album Order of the Black.

Orange County Choppers MotoCoaster 
The MotoCoaster is a Zamperla built motorbike themed roller coaster installed at Darien Lake theme park in Darien Lake, NY. It was the first motorbike roller coaster to be installed in the United States, though the Pony Express, a similar model of coaster with horse themed trains, was erected Knott's Berry Farm. The MotoCoaster is the same model as the prototype located outside Zamperla's factory in Italy.

The MotoCoaster opened in May 2008 with Orange County Choppers securing the naming rights. The MotoCoaster is located near the Darien Square area of the park, between Boomerang and Twister. Orange County Choppers built a custom motorcycle inspired by the ride and the park. The coaster was originally named the Orange County Choppers Motocoaster when it first opened in 2008. However, the name was changed to the MotoCoaster in 2010 after the naming rights with OCC expired.

References 

Other sources

External links 

Orange County Choppers on CMT

Motorcycle manufacturers of the United States
Companies based in Orange County, New York
American Chopper
Vehicle manufacturing companies established in 1999
CMT (American TV channel) original programming
Buildings and structures in Newburgh, New York
1999 establishments in New York (state)